Eric Nadel (born May 16, 1951) is a sports announcer on radio broadcasts for the Texas Rangers baseball organization. In 2014, he was honored with the Ford C. Frick Award for broadcasting excellence by the National Baseball Hall of Fame and Museum.

Biography
Nadel grew up in Brooklyn, New York, as a fan of the Brooklyn Dodgers and decided at a young age that he wanted to be a sports broadcaster. He developed his skills at Brown University (class of 1972), announcing hockey and football games on radio station WBRU. He had minor league hockey play-by-play stints in Muskegon, Oklahoma City, and Dallas, and was also the radio voice of the Dallas Diamonds of the Women's Professional Basketball League.

The Rangers hired Nadel in 1979, and he called games on television and radio in his first three seasons. Beginning in 1982, he began a 13-year run with Mark Holtz as the radio team on WBAP, returning to the television booth for one year in 1984. Nadel became the team's lead radio voice when Holtz moved to television in 1995. Since becoming the primary play-by-play voice for the Rangers, Nadel has worked alongside Brad Sham, Vince Cotroneo, and Victor Rojas.

In May 2006, Nadel announced that he had signed a "lifetime contract" with the Rangers, allowing him to continue on their broadcast team until he chooses to retire. He later said that he hopes to outlive his contract. Beginning in 2009, he was partnered with longtime ESPN and former Dallas Mavericks and San Antonio Spurs announcer Dave Barnett, who also did Rangers games on television with Brad Sham in the late 80s and early 90s. After Barnett moved to television, former MLB pitcher Steve Busby was Nadel's partner. Since July 2012 after Busby replaced Barnett on television, Nadel has been joined by Matt Hicks in the radio booth. Rangers games are now primarily on 105.3 The Fan, which has been the Rangers' flagship station since the 2015 season. At the conclusion of the 2018 season, Nadel joined a handful of broadcasters to call Major League Baseball games for 40 years, with the added distinction of calling all of them for one franchise.

Among Nadel's most memorable calls was the 5000th strikeout of Nolan Ryan's career on August 22, 1989. His main home run call is "That ball is history!"

The arrival of Rubén Sierra in Texas motivated Nadel to learn Spanish. Nadel is now a fluent Spanish speaker, having taken part in Spanish-language game broadcasts in a number of Latin American countries.

Awards

In 1991, Nadel was inducted into the Texas Baseball Hall of Fame. He has received the National Sportscasters and Sportswriters Association Texas Sportscaster of the Year Award seven times (1999, 2001, 2002, 2006, 2009, 2010, 2011) and won the Associated Press award for Best Play-by-Play in Texas three times. On August 11, 2012, Nadel became the 15th member inducted into the Texas Rangers Hall of Fame.  

On December 11, 2013, Nadel was selected as the 2014 recipient of the Ford C. Frick Award, presented annually for excellence in broadcasting by the National Baseball Hall of Fame and Museum. Nadel received the award at a ceremony at Doubleday Field on Saturday, July 26, 2014, as part of the Hall of Fame 2014 weekend festivities. 

In recognition of his achievements, Nadel's high school alma mater, Midwood High School at Brooklyn College, has created the Eric Nadel Memorial Award for Athletic Improvement and Character. It will be awarded annually to a deserving student athlete.

On January 21, 2023 Eric was awarded the Shalom Award by the Temple Shalom Brotherhood in recognition of his many years of community service and humanitarian work.

Personal life 
Nadel appeared as the Rangers' radio announcer in the film The Rookie in 2002.

Nadel is active in animal causes and was one of the founders of the first leash-free dog park in the DFW Metroplex at White Rock Lake in Dallas. He stages benefit concerts for non-profit organizations, including Focus on Teens and Cafe Momentum, and is an active advocate for mental health organizations such as NAMI and The Campaign to Change Direction.

Nadel is also the author of several books (see Bibliography). In 2018, inspired after reading a rhymed radio ad, he began writing baseball-inspired limericks. His limericks have been published in a book titled Lim-Eric!.

Bibliography 

Nadel, Eric. The Night Wilt Scored 100: Tales from Basketball's Past. New York: Taylor Publishing, 1990.
 Nadel, Eric. The Texas Rangers : The Authorized History. New York: Taylor Trade Publishing, 1997.
 Nadel, Eric and Craig R. Wright. The Man Who Stole First Base: Tales from Baseball's Past. New York: Taylor Publishing, 1989.

References
 Block, Zachary.  "At the old ball game: Eric Nadel '72."  Brown Alumni Magazine. March/April 2004. (ISSN 1520-863X)

External links
Eric Nadel Ford C. Frick Award biography at the National Baseball Hall of Fame
Official Bio on Texas Rangers Site

1951 births
Living people
American radio personalities
American sports announcers
Brown University alumni
Ford C. Frick Award recipients
Major League Baseball broadcasters
Sportspeople from Brooklyn
Texas Rangers (baseball) announcers
Midwood High School alumni